Baudu is a surname. Notable people with the surname include:

 Lucie Baudu (born 1993), French slalom canoeist
 Stéphane Baudu (born 1956), French politician

See also
 Baitu (disambiguation)

Surnames of French origin
French-language surnames